Choe Mi-gyong (born 17 January 1991) is a North Korean football player that plays for the North Korea women's national football team and Rimyongsu Sports Club. She played in the 2012 Summer Olympics, and was known as being the only player to receive a red card in the women's tournament.

International goals

References

External links
Choe Mi-gyong at Asian Games Incheon 2014

North Korean women's footballers
Olympic footballers of North Korea
1991 births
Living people
2011 FIFA Women's World Cup players
Footballers at the 2012 Summer Olympics
Footballers at the 2014 Asian Games
Asian Games medalists in football
North Korea women's international footballers
Asian Games gold medalists for North Korea
Women's association footballers not categorized by position
Medalists at the 2014 Asian Games